Carlos André Santos de Jesus, known as Carlos André (born 27 February 1987) is a Brazilian football player. He also holds Portuguese citizenship.

Club career
He made his professional debut in the Cypriot First Division for Olympiakos Nicosia on 16 January 2011 in a game against Anorthosis Famagusta.

References

External links
Carlos André at ZeroZero

1987 births
Sportspeople from Bahia
Living people
Brazilian footballers
Brazilian expatriate footballers
Cypriot First Division players
Liga Portugal 2 players
Thai League 2 players
Fortaleza Esporte Clube players
S.C. Beira-Mar players
C.D. Tondela players
Olympiakos Nicosia players
C.R. Caála players
Girabola players
Sport Benfica e Castelo Branco players
F.C. Barreirense players
Bangkok F.C. players
C.D. Fátima players
Concórdia Atlético Clube players
G.D. Fabril players
Association football defenders
Brazilian expatriate sportspeople in Thailand
Brazilian expatriate sportspeople in Cyprus
Brazilian expatriate sportspeople in Portugal
Brazilian expatriate sportspeople in Angola
Expatriate footballers in Thailand
Expatriate footballers in Cyprus
Expatriate footballers in Portugal
Expatriate footballers in Angola